The movement to overthrow the worship of gods (Hangul: 미신 타파 운동 misin tapa undong), also described as movement to overthrow superstition, as 미신 misin is also translated after the movement, was a series of waves of demonization and attempted violent uprooting of Korean shamanism and folk religion that took place in the period between the late 19th century and the 1980s. In modern Korean language, misin has the meaning of "illusory" or "false spiritual beliefs", and implies that gods and ancestors do not exist. This term was adopted from Japanese in the late 19th century, and largely emphasized by Christian missionaries to target Korean indigenous religion.

Waves of misin tapa undong started in the 1890s with the rise of influence of Protestant preachers in Korea, culminating during the New Community Movement of the 20th century, in South Korea. These movements destroyed most of the indigenous cults and shrines of folk religion, which were largely replaced by Christianity.

Waves

Late Joseon (1890s)

Protestantism sunk deep roots in Korea in the 1890s, establishing a network of schools and hospitals. Protestant missionaries labeled indigenous religious practices and shamans as "devil worship". The missionaries led campaigns for the burning of idols, ancestral tablets, shamans' tools and clothes, and shrines. According to missionary reports, they were "destroyed as were the "books" (magic scrolls) in Ephesus". The missionaries also circulated stories about shamans who had converted to Christianity becoming themselves advocates of the destruction of the indigenous religion. The exorcistic struggle between a shaman and a Christian was made into a literary motif in Kim Tongni's colonial-period novella Portrait of a Shaman.

Missionaries found allies among Korean intellectuals in the final years of the Joseon kingdom. Together, they produced The Independent (Tongnip Sinmun), the first newspaper published in Korean language. The newspaper promoted iconoclasm and addressed government officials on the necessity to eradicate the indigenous religion.

In 1896, the police began to arrest shamans, destroy shrines and burn ritual tools. These events were acclaimed by The Independent. At one point, the newspaper even came to criticize Buddhist monks.

Japanese occupation (1910–1945)

Campaigns against Korean indigenous religious traditions also accompanied Japan's annexation of the Korean peninsula. The Japanese had already equated secularization with modernity in their own country. The colonial police harassed and sometimes arrested shamans, though official policies against Korean shamanism were neither monolithic nor consistent.

Following the rhetoric of The Independent of the foregoing generation, the colonial government portrayed the indigenous religion and the shamans as irrational and wasteful, adding the notion that they were also unhygienic. Urban people adopted this rhetoric, seeking to distinguish themselves from their own rural origins. Migrants to the cities rejected gut healing and traditional medicine.

This paradigm would have become central to the projects for countryside development enacted in the independent South Korea.

Syngman Rhee government (1948–1960)
Under Syngman Rhee's government, shamans were routinely harassed and arrested by the police. Protestants in Jeju Island led a "campaign against gods", through which they tried to exterminate Jeju's religious tradition and its pantheon of 18,000 deities.

New Community Movement (1970s)

In the 1970s, the president Park Chung-hee started the New Community Movement (Saemaul Undong), a mass mobilization intended to transform rural society in both form and spirit. Local communities were involved in a variety of public works.

Under the banner of such reform, a formal "Movement to Overthrow Superstition" (Misin Tapa Undong) was started. With official encouragement, police and local leaders suppressed gut rites and local cults. They poured gasoline on village shrines and torched them, destroyed sacred trees, totem poles, and cairns, raided gut and arrested shamans. Contemporary commenters criticize the movement for having damaged the indigenous religious tradition and having caused much of the South Korean population to adopt the foreign Christian religion.

Legacy
In the aftermath of the wave of "anti-superstition movements", Korean indigenous religion was severely weakened. Since the 1980s, however, traditional religion and shamanism have experienced a revival in South Korea. Since the 1990s, shamans started to be regarded as "bearers of culture". Today, Korean shamanism is recognized as a legitimate religion in South Korea, and there is widespread acknowledgement of "Muism" or "Sindo"—however shamanism is called—as the natural religion of the Koreans.

See also

 Religious persecution
 Religion in Korea

References

Sources
 
 

Religion in South Korea
Korean shamanism
Persecution by Christians